State Route 102 (SR-102) is a state highway in the U.S. state of Utah that connects Tremonton with I-84, SR-83, and the towns of Deweyville, Bothwell, Thatcher, Penrose, and Thiokol's facility in Box Elder County.

Route description

The route starts on SR-83 east of Lampo Junction travelling northeast. Soon after, the route intersects I-84 at Bothwell Junction, passes under I-15, passes through Tremonton and Haws Corner Junction and ending at SR-38 in Deweyville at the base of the Wellsville Mountains.

History

SR-102 was originally designated in 1931 as the road from Deweyville to Haws Corner. In 1969, the route was extended westward through Tremonton to SR-83 east of Lampo Junction (this stretch of road was formerly part of SR-3).

In 1966, the counties in northern Utah requested that the State Road Commission designate a single route number to run east–west across that part of the state. This route overlapped SR-102 between Deweyville and I-84. For this new route, the number SR-30 was selected, but there were no legislative description changes of the highways. Instead, the old route numbers were kept and marked on small, rectangular signs below the SR-30 shields.

In the 1977 renumbering, the legislative description of this new route was changed to SR-30, resulting in SR-102's eastern terminus being moved to I-84. In 1989, the commission resolved that, once I-15 was completed north of Tremonton, SR-30 would be rerouted to replace SR-129, with SR-102 being extended back to Deweyville.

Major intersections

References

102
 102